Phyllonorycter caryaealbella is a moth of the family Gracillariidae. It is known from Georgia, Kentucky, Wisconsin and Florida in the United States.

The wingspan is about 5 mm.

The larvae feed on Carya illinoinensis and Carya ovata. They mine the leaves of their host plant. The mine has the form of a tentiform mine on the underside of the leaf. The parenchyma is eaten off of the upper cuticle in a ring, leaving a green spot in the centre, which is then eaten off. The pupa is contained in an oval cocoon made of frass.

References

caryaealbella
Moths of North America
Moths described in 1871